In the 2007–08 season of competitive football (soccer) in Cape Verde The 2nd Cape Verdean Cup was to took place that year but it was can celled due to that n ineligible player were fielded from Académica Fogo and later Sal Rei.

Diary of the season
February 9: Estadio Municipal Arsénio Ramos completed and opened in Sal Rei on the island of Boa Vista
Sport Sal Rei Club won their 7th title  for Boa Vista
GD Corôa won their only title for Brava
Académica do Fogo won their 17th and recent title for Fogo
Académica da Calheta won their 2nd title for Maio
Académico do Aeroporto won their 9th title for Sal
Scorpion Vermelho won their 2nd title for Santiago North
Sporting Clube da Praia won their 4th title for Santiago South
Solpontense won their 3rd title Santo Antão North
Fiorentina Porto Novo won their only title for Santo Antão South
Desportivo Ribeira Brava won their 3rd and recent title for São Nicolau
FC Derby won their 9th title for São Vicente
May 10: 2008 Cape Verdean Football Championships began
Early June: The National championships took a break due to the 2008 local elections
June 8: Two rescheduled first round match took place, one of them where Bairro defeated Fiorentina Porto Novo 6-1 and made it the highest scoring match and the largest goal difference until June 14
June 14: Sporting Praia defeated Corôa Brava 6-0 and made it the highest scoring match of the national season
July 5: As Académica do Fogo fielded a player suspended in the Fogo Cup, the knockout stage, Sal Rei also fielded an ineligible player and the knockout stage was rescheduled
July 6: Académico 83 do Porto Inglês celebrated its 25th anniversary
July 26: Knockout stage begins
August 9: Championship finals begins
August 16: Sporting Clube da Praia won their 7th national championship title

Final standings

Cape Verdean Football Championships

Sporting Praia and FC Derby were first in each group along with  Académica do Fogo and AD Bairro, second of each group.  Derby had the most points numbering 15 followed by Sporting Praia.  Sporting scored the most with 15 goals followed by Derby with 14, Bairro with 12 and Académica Fogo with 8. As Académica Fogo fielded an ineligible player who got the red card during the Fogo Cup final while Sal Rei fielded an ineligible player during the championships, it was the last time the national championships were delayed to July 26 while the finals were rescheduled to August 9 and 16.  It cancelled the second Cape Verdean National Cup that season. Later, Derby advanced to the finals with five goals scored while Sporting Praia advanced with four goals. Derby won the first match 1-0, Sporting won the second leg 3-0 and claimed their 7th national title.

Group A

Group B

Final Stages

Leading goalscorer: Fufuco - 9 goals

Island or regional competitions

Regional Championships

Regional Cups

Regional Super Cups
The 2007 champion winner played with a 2007 cup winner (when a club won both, a second place club competed).

Regional Opening Tournaments

Famous debutants
Babanco - 22-year-old midfielder, debuted with Sporting Praia of the Santiago South Zone and later the national championships
Kuca - 18-year-old forward, debuted with AD Bairro of the Santiago South Zone
Tom Tavares - 21-year-old midfielder, debuted with Estrela dos Amadores of the Santiago North Zone

Transfer deals
 Aires Marques from Sporting Praia to  Académica de Coimbra
 Fufuco from AD Bairro to Boavista Praia

See also
2007 in Cape Verde
2008 in Cape Verde
Timeline of Cape Verdean football

References

 
 
2007 in association football
2008 in association football